New Cumberland is the name of several towns or cities in the United States of America:

New Cumberland, Pennsylvania
New Cumberland, West Virginia